The Eighth Federal Electoral District of Chihuahua (VIII Distrito Electoral Federal de Chihuahua) is one of the 300 Electoral Districts into which Mexico is divided for the purpose of elections to the federal Chamber of Deputies and one of nine such districts in the state of Chihuahua.

It elects one deputy to the lower house of Congress for each three-year legislative period, by means of the first past the post system.

District territory
Under the 2005 districting scheme, Chihuahua's Eighth District comprises the eastern and northern portions of Chihuahua Municipality, including approximately one-half of the urban area of the city of Chihuahua. The other half of the city, and the rest of the municipality, is covered by the Sixth District.

The district's head town (cabecera distrital), where results from individual polling stations are gathered together and collated, is the city of Chihuahua.

Previous districting schemes

1996–2005 district
Between 1996 and 2005, the Eighth District covered the southern portion of Chihuahua Municipality, the part south of the Río Chuvíscar.

1979–1996 district
Between 1979 and 1996, the  Eighth District covered the urban area of Ciudad Juárez.

Deputies returned to Congress from this district

LI Legislature
 1979–1982:  Mario Legarreta Hernández (PRI)
LII Legislature
 1982–1985:  Dora Villegas Nájera (PRI)
LIII Legislature
 1985–1988:  Edeberto Galindo Martínez (PAN)
LIV Legislature
 1988–1991:  Saúl Flores Prieto (PAN)
LV Legislature
 1991–1994:  José Luis Canales de la Vega (PRI)
LVI Legislature
 1994–1997:  Héctor González Mocken (PRI)
LVII Legislature
 1997–2000:  Francisco Martínez Ortega (PRI)
LVIII Legislature
 2000–2002:  José Mario Rodríguez Álvarez (PAN)
 2002–2003:  Manuel Narváez Narváez (PAN)
LIX Legislature
 2003–2004:  Martha Laguette (PRI)
 2004:  Kenny Arroyo González (PRI)
 2004–2006:  Martha Laguette (PRI)
LX Legislature
 2006–2009:  Carlos Reyes López (PAN)

References and notes

Federal electoral districts of Mexico
Chihuahua (state)